Ireland, the Oppressed is a 1912 American silent film produced by Kalem Company and distributed by General Film Company. It was directed by Sidney Olcott with himself, Jack J. Clark and Alice Hollister.

Cast
 Jack J. Clark - 
 Alice Hollister - her sweetheart
 Sidney Olcott - Father Falvey
 Robert Vignola - Michael Dee
 J.P. McGowan - Major

Production notes
 The film was shot in Beaufort, co Kerry, Ireland during the summer of 1912.

References
 Michel Derrien, Aux origines du cinéma irlandais: Sidney Olcott, le premier oeil, TIR 2013.

External links
 
  Ireland, the Oppressed website dedicated to Sidney Olcott

1912 films
Silent American drama films
American silent short films
Films set in Ireland
Films shot in Ireland
Films directed by Sidney Olcott
1912 short films
1912 drama films
American black-and-white films
1910s American films